Amorbia jaczewskii is a species of moth of the family Tortricidae. It is found in Carchi Province, Ecuador.

The wingspan is about 26 mm for males and 30 mm for females. The ground colour of the forewings of the males is glossy brownish ferruginous, with browner strigulation (fine streaks) and posterior veins. The hindwings are cream, tinged ochreous on the periphery and browner and strigulated brown near the apex. The ground colour of the forewings of the females is ferruginous with brown strigulation. The hindwings are cream, tinged with ferruginous and paler basally.

Etymology
The species is named in honour of Professor Dr Tadeusz Jaczewski.

References

Moths described in 2008
Sparganothini
Moths of South America
Taxa named by Józef Razowski